Vítor Tormena de Farias (born 4 January 1996) is a Brazilian footballer who plays for Portuguese club S.C. Braga as a defender.

Formed at São Paulo where he played only in the Copa Paulista, he played most of his career in Portugal, making over 100 appearances for Braga with whom he won the Taça da Liga (2020) and Taça de Portugal (2021). He also represented Gil Vicente and Portimonense in the country.

Club career

São Paulo
Born in Marília, São Paulo state, Tormena came through the youth system of São Paulo FC. He played nine games for them in the 2016 Copa Paulista, debuting on 7 July in a goalless home draw with Red Bull Brasil.

On 8 January 2017, Tormena joined Grêmio Novorizontino on loan for the Campeonato Paulista campaign. He played only once, in a 3–1 loss at Santos FC on 30 March.

Gil Vicente
On 27 June 2017, Tormena joined Portuguese LigaPro club Gil Vicente F.C. On 6 August, he made his debut in a 2–1 victory over FC Porto B. He was sent off on 25 February 2018 in a 2–1 loss a C.D. Santa Clara, and scored his first goal on 15 April to open a 1–1 draw at U.D. Oliveirense, as his team suffered relegation.

In September 2018, Tormena was loaned to Primeira Liga club Portimonense S.C. for the season. A regular during his stay on the Algarve, he scored once away to reigning champions FC Porto on 7 December, though they won 4–1.

Braga
On 13 June 2019, Tormena signed a five-year deal at S.C. Braga. He made his debut on 15 August as a 71st-minute substitute for Pablo in a 3–1 win (7–3 aggregate) over Brøndby IF in the UEFA Europa League third qualifying round – his continental debut. He played only eight other games through the whole season, including the 1–0 win over Porto in the Taça da Liga final on 25 January 2020; he was affected by two injuries, which he described as the first of his career.

Tormena scored his first goal on 3 December 2020, opening a 4–2 win at AEK Athens F.C. in the UEFA Europa League, putting Braga into the last 16. Eleven days later, as a substitute, he netted again in a 7–0 win at Clube Olímpico do Montijo in the fourth round of the Taça de Portugal. The following 20 January, he netted the winner in a 2–1 League Cup semi-final win over S.L. Benfica, and played in the final loss to Sporting CP.

On 14 April 2022, Tormena was sent off just before half time in a Europa League quarter-final second leg away to Rangers, for a foul on Kemar Roofe; James Tavernier converted the penalty as the Scots won 3–1 to overturn Braga's 1–0 win in the first game. He scored his first league goal for the club on 3 September in a home win over local rivals Vitória de Guimarães, with the last touch of the game in the eighth minute of added time; on 13 November he and Paulo Oliveira were sent off at the end of a 2–1 win at Portimonense. The following 16 February he was again sent off in a European defeat as the team lost 4–0 at home to ACF Fiorentina in the UEFA Europa Conference League knockout round play-off; his foul on Luka Jović was initially given a yellow card until video assistant referee review.

Career statistics

Honours
Braga
Taça de Portugal: 2020–21
Taça da Liga: 2019–20

References

External links

1996 births
Living people
People from Marília
Footballers from São Paulo (state)
Association football defenders
Brazilian footballers
São Paulo FC players
Grêmio Novorizontino players
Gil Vicente F.C. players
Portimonense S.C. players
S.C. Braga players
Primeira Liga players
Liga Portugal 2 players
Brazilian expatriate footballers
Brazilian expatriate sportspeople in Portugal
Expatriate footballers in Portugal